Waller  may refer to:

Places in the United States
 Waller, Pennsylvania
 Waller, Texas
 Waller, Washington
 Waller County, Texas

People
 Waller (surname)
 nickname of John Walsh (rugby league), English rugby league footballer in the 1960s and '70s

Other uses
 Waller baronets, two baronetcies, one in the Baronetage of Ireland and one in the Baronetage of the United Kingdom
 Waller, an occupation in open-pan salt making

See also

 Waller v. Florida, a 1970 United States Supreme Court case
 
 Wall (disambiguation)